Pachnephorus gardinii is a species of leaf beetle found in Senegal, Gambia, Guinea Bissau, Mali, Ivory Coast, Nigeria, Chad, Cameroon, Sudan, Ethiopia, Kenya, the Republic of the Congo, the
Democratic Republic of the Congo, Rwanda and Tanzania, described by Stefano Zoia in 2007. It is named after Giulio Gardini, a friend of the author.

References

Eumolpinae
Beetles of the Democratic Republic of the Congo
Insects of West Africa
Insects of Chad
Insects of Cameroon
Insects of Ethiopia
Insects of Kenya
Insects of the Republic of the Congo
Insects of Rwanda
Insects of Tanzania
Beetles described in 2007